The Campeonato Argentino de Básquet ("Argentine Basketball Championship" in English) is the oldest basketball competition still running in Argentina. The first edition of the tournament was held in 1928, having been played (with some interruptions) to present days. The Campeonato Argentino is played by teams representing Argentine's provincial sides.

Due to being contested by provinces all over Argentina, his competition has been called "The most Argentine championship of all".

History

The first edition of Campeonato Argentino was held in the clay court field of YMCA of Buenos Aires. Santa Fe, Córdoba and two teams from FABB took part of the tournament. Córdoba was the first team outside Buenos Aires to win a championship, in 1932 and 1933. Other provincial sides such as Santa Fe (1934-1935) and Santiago del Estero (1937, with Rafael Lledó as notable player) would win their first national titles also. 

Buenos Aires Province was the most winning team between 1966 and 1978, with Bahiense players Alberto Pedro Cabrera, Atilio Fruet and José De Lizaso, plus other players from La Plata, Gehrmann, Galliadi, Sfeir, Carlos González. Buenos Aires played 13 consecutive finals, winning 10 of them.

Champions

Titles by team

References 

1928 establishments in Argentina
Basketball competitions in Argentina
Recurring sporting events established in 1928